Takydromus tachydromoides, the Japanese grass lizard, is a wall lizard species of the genus Takydromus. It is found in Japan. Its Japanese name is 'kanahebi' (カナヘビ). 'Hebi' means 'snake' in Japanese, although this lizard is not a snake. There are three lizards found in the four main islands of Japan. The other two are the Japanese gekko (also, Schlegel's Japanese gekko, Gekko japonicus), and the Okada's Five-lined Skink (Eumeces latiscutatus, also Plestiodon latiscutatus; this skink shows five lines only as a juvenile).

Live food
House cricket
Waxworm
Rough woodlouse

References

Takydromus
Reptiles of Japan
Reptiles described in 1838
Taxa named by Hermann Schlegel